Unchained may refer to:

Film and TV 
 Unchained (film), a 1955 American prison film
 The Man Who Broke 1,000 Chains or Unchained, a 1987 film
 "Unchained" (Law & Order: Criminal Intent), a 2005 episode of Law & Order: Criminal Intent
 "Unchained" (Arrow), a 2016 episode of Arrow

Music
 "Unchained" (song), a 1981 song by Van Halen
 Unchained (EP), a 1983 EP by Thor
 Unchained (David Allan Coe album), 1985
 Unchained, a 1995 album by Celinda Pink
 Unchained (Johnny Cash album), 1996
 "Unchained", a song by HammerFall from the album Glory to the Brave, 1997
 Unchained, a 2009 album by Joe Nina
 "Unchained", a song by Lacuna Coil from the album Shallow Life, 2009
 Unchained (Molly Sandén album), 2012

See also 
 "Unchained Melody", the theme song from the 1955 film